Yvonne Golland is an English former cricketer who played as a bowler. She appeared in three One Day Internationals for Young England in the 1973 Women's Cricket World Cup, scoring 17 runs and taking two wickets. She played domestic cricket for West Midlands.

References

External links
 
 

Living people
Date of birth missing (living people)
Place of birth missing (living people)
Young England women cricketers
West Midlands women cricketers
Year of birth missing (living people)